A Caribbeanist is a scholar who specializes in the study of the Caribbean region of the Americas -- its literature, culture, politics, society, ecology and so forth. In some academic disciplines Caribbean studies are seen as a branch of the larger field of Latin American studies.

See also 
 Vera Mae Green

External links
Library Guides for Caribbean Studies
 
 Latin American, Caribbean, U.S. Latinx, and Iberian Online Free E-Resources (LACLI). Retrieved 17 March 2023.
 
 
 
 
 

Caribbean studies
Latin American studies